Penicillium viticola is a species of fungus in the genus Penicillium which was isolated from grapes in Yamanashi Prefecture in Japan. Penicillium viticola produces calcium malate

References

Further reading 
 
 

viticola
Fungi described in 2011